Ericameria brachylepis is a North American species of flowering shrub in the family Asteraceae known by the common names chaparral goldenbush and boundary goldenbush.

It is native to Arizona, southern California and northern Baja California where it is a member of the chaparral plant community.

Description
Ericameria brachylepis is a bushy shrub growing 100–200 cm (40-80 inches) high with branches covered in thready leaves up to 2.5 centimeters (1.0 inch) long.

The inflorescence is a cluster of flower heads, each head lined with phyllaries and resin glands. The flower head contains several yellow disc florets and no ray florets. The fruit is a small achene topped with a white pappus.

References

External links
Calflora Database: Ericameria brachylepis
Jepson Manual Treatment of Ericameria brachylepis
United States department of Agriculture Plants Profile
Ericameria brachylepis — Calphotos Photos gallery, University of California

brachylepis
Flora of California
Flora of Arizona
Flora of Baja California
Natural history of the California chaparral and woodlands
Natural history of the Peninsular Ranges
Plants described in 1876
Taxa named by Asa Gray
Flora without expected TNC conservation status